Alfons Spielhoff (July 3, 1912 — December 9, 1987) was a German politician, serving as the minister of cultural affairs for Dortmund in the 1970s. Under the slogan "cultural policy is social policy", he was an advocate of redirecting cultural budgets away from the traditional fine arts based in the city center, towards community-based and popular art forms in decentralized venues. These proposals led to heated disputes over the city's cultural policy during his time in office.

1912 births
1987 deaths
Politicians from Essen
People from the Rhine Province
Social Democratic Party of Germany politicians
German Peace Society members